The Wilderness is a historic home located near Catonsville, Baltimore County, Maryland.  It  is a large stone and frame house located in a wooded setting west of Catonsville.  The original home was built about 1800, and it attained its current appearance following a major expansion in 1899–1900, when it was a summer residence of Francis Cumberland Dugan II (1830-1914).  It features multiple roof and dormer shapes and a wraparound porch reminiscent of the Queen Anne style.  The third story is located within a tall mansard roof. Also on the property are a stone springhouse / smokehouse, a summer kitchen, log tenant house, and a large frame barn.

The house was listed on the National Register of Historic Places in 1985.

References

External links
, including photo from 1899, at Maryland Historical Trust

Houses in Baltimore County, Maryland
Houses on the National Register of Historic Places in Maryland
Queen Anne architecture in Maryland
Colonial Revival architecture in Maryland
National Register of Historic Places in Baltimore County, Maryland